Winsili (foaled 1 February 2010) is a British Thoroughbred racehorse who won the 2013 running of the Group One Nassau Stakes.

References

2010 racehorse births
Racehorses bred in the United Kingdom
Racehorses trained in the United Kingdom
Thoroughbred family 1-n